Nilufer Zafarullah (born 6 June 1949) is a Bangladeshi politician who was a member of the 9th and 10th parliaments from the Bangladesh Awami League. She is a director of Chittagong Independent University and Independent University Bangladesh.

She was named in the 2016 Panama Papers leak. She is the current chairman of a commercial bank, Midland Bank Ltd. She is a director of Hong Kong Shanghai Manjala Textiles Limited.

References

Further reading
 
 

1949 births
Living people
Women members of the Jatiya Sangsad
Awami League politicians
21st-century Bangladeshi women politicians
10th Jatiya Sangsad members